The Embassy and Permanent Mission of Bangladesh in Vienna is the diplomatic mission of The People's Republic of Bangladesh to Austria. It is located at Hofzeile 4 street of Vienna. The Incumbent Bangladesh Ambassador to Austria is Abu Zafar.

History
Launched on 1 November 2014, the Embassy also serves as the Permanent Mission of Bangladesh to the UN Offices and other International Organizations in Vienna.

Mission leaders

Ambassador
 Abu Zafar (since 2014)

Other diplomatic staff
 Deputy Chief of Mission: Rahat Bin Zaman (since 2017)
 Counsellor: Maliha Shahjahan (since 2016)
 First Secretary & Head of Chancery: Md. Tarazul Islam (December 2019)

See also
 Austria–Bangladesh relations

References

Diplomatic missions in Vienna
Diplomatic missions of Bangladesh
Austria–Bangladesh relations